Matthew Allan Watson (born July 7, 1981, in  Oklahoma City) also known as Matt Watson,  is an American entrepreneur and the current CEO of  Stackify LLC, a technology company based in Leawood, Kansas. In 2003, Watson co-founded  and served as CTO of VinSolutions, a developer of online CRM and  lead management software for auto dealerships. In 2011, VinSolutions was sold for $135 million to AutoTrader.com. Then Watson founded Stackify in January 2012 to assist software developers in troubleshooting and support with a suite of tools including Prefix and Retrace.  Watson has credited his experience at VinSolutions for the skills necessary to build Stackify. During the same period, he also launched the Watson Technology Group to support other entrepreneurs via angel investing. Watson received a Bachelor of Science degree in computer information systems at DeVry University in 2009.

References

External links 
 Matt Watson's profile

American technology chief executives
American technology company founders
Living people
1981 births
DeVry University alumni
21st-century American businesspeople